Stacy Douglas Peralta (born October 15, 1957) is an American film director and entrepreneur. He was previously a professional skateboarder and surfer with the Zephyr Competition Team, also known as the Z-Boys, from Venice, California.

Early life
Peralta was born in Venice, California, of Mexican and Irish descent. At age 15, he began competing with the Z-Boys, a group sponsored by the surf shop Jeff Ho Surfboards and Zephyr Productions along with Perry Caravello. His second sponsor was Gordon and Smith. Peralta graduated from Venice High School in 1975.

Career

Skateboarding

At the age of 19, Peralta became the highest-ranked professional skateboarder. Soon after, he joined forces with manufacturer George Powell to form Powell Peralta, which would grow to be one of the most successful skateboard brands of the 1980s. With the financial backing of Powell-Peralta, Peralta formed the seminal Bones Brigade, a team composed of some of the best skaters at the time, many of whom revolutionized modern skateboarding.

Film work

In 1984, Peralta also directed and produced the first-ever skate video, the Bones Brigade Video Show.

Peralta is also credited in the 1985 movie Real Genius, playing the commander of a fictional space vehicle delivering a deadly laser blast to an unsuspecting criminal during the film's opening scene.

Peralta served as the Second Unit Director and Skating Technical Advisor in the 1989 film, Gleaming the Cube, directed by Graeme Clifford and starring Christian Slater. The movie featured a number of skateboarders from the Powell-Peralta team after screenplay writer Michael Tolkein became impressed with the skaters' abilities. As Peralta stated in 1987: "[Tolkein] never realized how into skating he would become. And he really has captured an authentic feel of what skating is about."

In 1992, Peralta left Powell-Peralta to direct and produce for television full-time. His love of skateboarding manifested itself in Dogtown and Z-Boys, a documentary film co-written with CR Stecyk III, regarding the legendary skateboard team known as the Z-Boys. The film, produced by Agi Orsi, reinforces the conviction that in the 1970s, much of the attention of the skateboarding media centered on Dogtown. Dogtown won Director's and Audience Awards for documentary at the 2001 Sundance Film Festival. Peralta also directed Riding Giants, a 2004 documentary of the history of modern big wave surfing and tow-in surfing. Following that, Peralta wrote the screenplay for the dramatic re-telling of the Dogtown days with Lords of Dogtown (2005). His 2008 documentary, Crips and Bloods: Made in America (2008), focuses on gang violence in South-Central Los Angeles. This film provides insights into the origins of the infamous Crips and Bloods street gangs, and also offers a look at the social injustice in Los Angeles in the 1950s and '60s. In 2012, Peralta produced Bones Brigade: An Autobiography, which chronicles the Powell-Peralta skateboarding team of the same name. It includes interviews with Rodney Mullen, Craig Stecyk, Tony Hawk, Lance Mountain, Steve Caballero, and Peralta himself, among others.

In 2008, Peralta directed a series of television commercials for Burger King in which the Greenlandic Inuit, Transylvanians of Romania and Hmong of Thailand, known as "Whopper virgins" in the ads, were offered their first taste of a fast food hamburger and asked to compare Burger King's Whopper to McDonald's Big Mac. Peralta subsequently came under attack for what some deemed exploitation of native peoples.

Peralta's experience as an entrepreneur and skate video filmmaker was adapted for the video game Tony Hawk's Underground. In 2003, Peralta also did cameo work for the game in which he played himself.

Divorced in the 1990s, Peralta had one son, pianist Austin Peralta who died on November 21, 2012.

Filmography

Film

Video games

Television

References

 Hayes, Andrea. "Dogtown and Z-Boys: Teaching the Documentary". Screen Education  40 (2005): 84–87. Academic Search Premier. Web. May 7, 2013.

External links

Nonfiction Unlimited biography
Interview with the Palisadian-Post

1957 births
American skateboarders
American sportspeople of Mexican descent
Living people
People from Venice, Los Angeles
Sundance Film Festival award winners
American people of Irish descent
Film directors from Los Angeles
Sportspeople from Los Angeles
Skateboarding video directors
Venice High School (Los Angeles) alumni